Adilcevaz District is a district of the Bitlis Province of Turkey. Its seat is the town of Adilcevaz. Its area is 1,586 km2, and its population is 30,123 (2021).

Composition
There are two municipalities in Adilcevaz District:
 Adilcevaz
 Aydınlar

There are 28 villages in Adilcevaz District:

 Akçıra
 Akyazı
 Aşağısüphan
 Aygırgölü
 Bahçedere
 Cihangir
 Çanakyayla
 Dizdar
 Erikbağı
 Esenkıyı
 Göldüzü
 Gölüstü
 Gümüşdüven
 Harmantepe
 Heybeli
 İpekçayır
 Karakolköy
 Karaşeyh
 Karşıyaka
 Kavuştuk
 Kömürlü
 Mollafadıl
 Örentaş
 Sefasahil
 Yarımada
 Yıldızköy
 Yolçatı
 Yukarısüphan

References

Districts of Bitlis Province